is a Japanese manga artist. He is known for his series AKB49: Ren'ai Kinshi Jōrei and Rent-A-Girlfriend.

Career
In October 2005, Reiji Miyajima received the Magazine Grand Prix Encouragement Award for his work . In the same year, he received an honorable mention at the 75th Weekly Shōnen Magazine Newcomer Manga Award for his one-shot manga Pool no Saboten. In 2008, he published his second one-shot manga Icon in Magazine Special.

Miyajima started in Weekly Shōnen Magazine by illustrating the short-term series Suzuki no Shiten in 2009. The following year, he illustrated the series AKB49: Ren'ai Kinshi Jōrei, which is based on the Japanese idol group AKB48. In 2017, Miyajima started the manga series Rent-A-Girlfriend, which has performed well in Japan. It has since received an anime adaptation and a spin-off manga. Miyajima has previously worked as an assistant for the manga series Ace of Diamond.

Aside from his manga career, Miyajima has also handled the series composition for the anime series 22/7. He also wrote the original story for its manga adaptation, 22/7 +α, which was serialized in Sunday Webry.

Works

Manga

Serializations
  (2009, written by Shigemitsu Harada; serialized in Weekly Shōnen Magazine)
  (2010–2016, written by Motoazabu Factory; serialized in Weekly Shōnen Magazine)
  (2016–2017, serialized in Weekly Shōnen Magazine)
  (2017–present, serialized in Weekly Shōnen Magazine)
 22/7 +α (2020, illustrated by Nao Kasai; serialized in Sunday Webry)
  (2020–present, serialized in Magazine Pocket)
  (2022–present, serialized in Young Animal)

One-shots
  (2005)
  (2008, published in Magazine Special)
  (2020, published in Weekly Shōnen Magazine)

Anime
  (2020, series composition)

References

External links
 

Living people
Manga artists
Year of birth missing (living people)